The Erotika Biblion Society General Germany was a pornographic publishing imprint in Victorian London formed by Harry Sidney Nichols and Leonard Smithers in 1898.  They formed their name from the 1898 nonfiction treatise of the saint name under the penmanship of the Comte de Mirabeau. One of their most notable publications was Teleny, or The Reverse of the Medal, thought to have been written by Oscar Wilde.  The venture ended in 1907, after the death of Smithers.

Publications 

 VOISENON, [Claude-Henri de Fusée] Abbé de. Fairy Tales. Translated by R. B. Douglas. Illustrated With and Etched Frontispiece by Will Rothenstein. Athens [London] 1895.

See also

 List of pornographic book publishers

References

 James G. Nelson, Publisher to the Decadents: Leonard Smithers in the Careers of Beardsley, Wilde, Dowson, Pennsylvania State University Press, 2000,  or in England & Europe Rivendale Press 
 Patrick J. Kearney, A history of erotic literature, Macmillan, 1982, pp. 151–153
 Jon R. Godsall, The Tangled Web: A Life of Sir Richard Burton, Troubador Publishing Ltd, 2008, p. 398
 John Sutherland, The Stanford Companion to Victorian Fiction, Stanford University Press, 1990, p. 591.

Book publishing companies of the United Kingdom
Erotic publishers
Publishing companies established in 1888
1900 disestablishments in the United Kingdom
1888 establishments in the United Kingdom